Sodium ferric gluconate complex, sold under the brand name Ferrlecit, is an intravenously administered iron medication for the treatment of iron deficiency anemia in adults and in children aged six years and older with chronic kidney disease receiving hemodialysis who are receiving supplemental epoetin therapy. The macromolecule has an apparent molecular weight of 289,000 – 440,000 Dalton.

The most common side effects in adults are nausea, vomiting and/or diarrhea, injection site reaction, hypotension, cramps, hypertension, dizziness, dyspnea, chest pain, leg cramps, and pain. In children the most common side effects are hypotension, headache, hypertension, tachycardia and vomiting.

References

External links 
 

Antianemic preparations
Gluconates
Iron(III) compounds
Sodium compounds